}}
| recovery_cases  = 
| deaths          = 
| fatality_rate   = 
| suspected_cases = 
| territories     = 
| total_ili       = 
| website         = 
| youtube         = 
}}
The first case of the COVID-19 pandemic in India was reported on 30 January 2020, originating from China. Slowly, the pandemic spread to various states and union territories including the state of Telangana. The first case was recorded in this region on 2 March from a man who had travel history with the UAE.

Timeline

June 2020
 As on 7 June, total number of cases in Telangana was 3650, including 1771 active cases 137 deaths and 1742 recoveries.
 As on 22 June, total number of cases in tjjbkggkr, including 4452 active cases 217 deaths and 4005 cures.
 On 23 July, the total number of cases in Telangana crossed the grim milestone of 10000 cases.
 As on 26 June, total number of cases was 11364, including 6446 active cases 230 deaths and 4688 cures.

July 2020
 As on 6 July, total number of cases in Telangana was 25733, including 10646 active cases 306 deaths and 14781 recoveries.
 As on 15 July, total number of cases was 39342, including 12957 active cases 386 deaths and 25999 recoveries.
 As on 17 July, total number of cases was 42496, including 13388 active cases 403 fatalities and 28705 recoveries.
 On 23 July, the total number of cases in Telangana crossed the grim milestone of 50000.
 As on 27 July, total number of cases was 54059, including 12264 active cases 463 deaths and 41332 recoveries.
 As on 29 July, total number of cases was 60717, including 15640 active cases 505 deaths and 44572 recoveries.
 As on 30 July, total number of cases was 62703, including 16796 active cases 519 deaths and 45388 recoveries.
 As on 31 July, total number of cases was 64786, including 17754 active cases 530 deaths and 46502 recoveries.

Aug 2020

September 2020
 As on 3 September, total number of cases in Telangana was 133406, including 32537 active cases 856 deaths and 100013 recoveries.
 As on 8 September, total number of cases was 145163, including 31670 active cases, 112587 recoveries and 906 deaths.
 As on 11 September, total number of cases was 152602, including 32195 active cases, 119467 cures and 940 deaths.
 As on 17 September, total number of cases was 165003, including 30443 active cases, 133555 recoveries and 1005 deaths.
 As on 24 September, total number of cases is 179246, including 30037 active cases, 148139 cures and 1070 deaths.
 As on 29 September, total number of cases is 189283, including 29477 active cases, 158690 recoveries and 1116 deaths.

October 2020
 As on 4 October, total number of cases in Telangana was 199276, including 27901 active cases, 1163 deaths and 170212 recoveries.
 On 5 October, total number of cases in Telangana crossed grim milestone of 200000 mark.
 As on 6 October, total number of cases in the state was 202594, including 26644 active cases, 174769 recoveries and 1181 fatalities.
 As on 14 October, total number of cases was 216238, including 23728 active cases, 191269 cures and 1241 fatalities.
 As on 21 October, total number of cases was 226124, including 20449 active cases, 204388 recoveries and 1287 deaths.
 As on 27 October, total number of cases was 232671, including 17890 active cases, 213466 recoveries and 1315 fatalities.

November 2020
 As on 8 November, total number of cases in Telangana was 250331, including 19890 active cases, 1377 deaths and 229064 recoveries.
 As on 24 November, total number of cases in Telangana is 265049, including 11047 active cases, 252565 recoveries and 1437 deaths.

December 2020
 As on 1 December, total number of cases in Telangana was 270318, including 9627 active cases, 259230 recoveries and 1461 deaths.
 As on 6 December, total number of cases in Telangana was 273341, including 8125 active cases, 263744 cures and 1472 deaths.
 As on 11 December, total number of cases was 276516, including 7604 active cases, 267427 cures and 1485 deaths.
 As on 21 December, total number of cases is 281730, including 6590 active cases, 273625 cures and 1515 deaths.
 As on 28 December, total number of cases is 285068, including 6231 active cases, 277304 cures and 1533 fatalities.
 As on 31 December, total number of cases is 286815, including 5815 active cases, 279456 recoveries and 1544 deaths.

January 2021
 As on 5 January, total number of cases in Telangana was 287993, including 5039 active cases, 281400 recoveries and 1554 deaths.
 As on 11 January, total number of cases was 290008, including 4518 active cases, 283924 recoveries and 1566 fatalities.
 As on 18 January, total number of cases was 291872, including 4049 active cases, 286244 cures and 1579 fatalities.
 As on 22 January, total number of cases was 292835, including 3781 active cases, 287468 cures and 1568 deaths.
 As on 26 January, total number of cases is 293590, including 3072 active cases, 288926 cures and 1592 deaths.

February 2021
 As on 1 February, total number of cases in Telangana was 294587, including 2092 active cases, 290894 recoveries and 1601 deaths.
 As on 13 February, total number of cases was 296567, including 1741 active cases, 293210 recoveries and 1616 fatalities.
 As on 20 February, total number of cases was 297435, including 1715 active cases, 294097 recoveries and 1623 deaths.

March 2021
 As on 7 March, total number of cases in Telangana was 299900, including 1886 active cases, 296373 recoveries and 1641 deaths.
 As on 15 March, total number of cases in Telangana was 301318, including 1983 active cases, 297681 cures and 1654 deaths.
 As on 29 March, total number of cases in was 306742, including 4583 active cases, 300469 cures and 1690 deaths.

April 2021
 As on 5 April, total number of cases in Telangana was 313237, including 8746 active cases, 302768 recoveries and 1723 deaths.
 As on 9 April, total number of cases was 321182, including 15472 active cases, 303964 recoveries and 1746 deaths.
 As on 21 April, total number of cases is 367901, including 46488 active cases, 319537 cures and 1876 deaths.

May 2021
 As on 7 May, total number of cases in Telangana was 481640, including 73851 active cases, 405164 recoveries and 2625 deaths.
 As on 18 May, total number of cases was 532784, including 49341 active cases, 480458 recoveries and 2985 deaths.
 As on 26 May, total number of cases was 563903, including 38632 active cases, 522082 cures and 3189 deaths.

June 2021
 As on 17 June, total number of cases in Telangana was 609817, including 19521 active cases, 586362 recoveries and 3534 deaths.
 As on 25 June, total number of cases was 618837, including 15524 active cases, 599695 recoveries and 3618 deaths.

July 2021
 As on 19 July, total number of cases in Telangana is 637373, including 9836 active cases, 623773 recoveries and 3764 deaths.

August 2021
 As on 27 August, total number of cases in Telangana was 656794, including 6166 active cases, 646761 recoveries and 3867 deaths.

September 2021
 As on 23 September, total number of cases in Telangana was 664164, including 4946 active cases, 655310 recoveries and 3908 deaths.
 As on 26 September, total number of cases was 664898, including 4701 active cases, 656285 cures and 3912 deaths.

Oct to Dec 2021
 As on 6 October, total number of cases in Telangana was 667158, including 4406 active cases, 658827 recoveries and 3925 deaths.
 As on 9 October, total number of cases was 667725, including 4288 active cases, 659508 cures and 3929 fatalities.
 As on 23 October, total number of cases was 670139, including 3984 active cases, 662209 cures and 3946 deaths.
 As on 2 November, total number of cases was 671463, including 4009 active cases, 663498 recoveries and 3956 deaths.
 As on 14 December, total number of cases was 678478, including 3837 active cases, 670633 recoveries and 4008 fatalities.
 As on 29 December, total number of cases was 681072, including 3459 active cases, 673589 recoveries and 4024 deaths.

Jan to Mar 2022
 As on 6 January, total number of cases in Telangana was 685543, including 6168 active cases, 675341 recoveries and 4034 deaths.
 As on 16 January, total number of cases was 707162, including 22017 active cases, 681091 cures and 4054 deaths.
 As on 26 January, total number of cases was 747155, including 38023 active cases, 705054 cures and 4078 fatal cases.
 As on 5 February, total number of cases was 776313, including 29226 active cases, 742988 recoveries and 4099 deaths.
 As on 12 February, total number of cases was 783019, including 13674 active cases, 765239 recoveries and 4106 deaths.
 As on 21 February, total number of cases was 787063, including 4787 active cases, 778167 recoveries and 4109 fatal cases.
 As on 19 February, total number of cases was 790689, including 740 active cases, 785840 cures and 4111 deaths.

Apr to Jun 2022
 As on 11 April, total number of cases in Telangana was 791522, including 213 active cases, 787198recoveries and 4111 deaths.
 As on 30 April, total number of cases was 792044, including 335 active cases, 787598 recoveries and 4111 deaths.
 As on 12 May, total number of cases was 792435, including 391 active cases, 787933 cures and 4111 deaths.
 As on 17 May, total number of cases was 792627, including 374 active cases, 788142 recoveries and 4111 fatal cases.
 As on 28 May, total number of cases was 793090, including 425 active cases, 788554 recoveries and 4111 deaths.
 As on 10 June, total number of cases was 794184, including 907 active cases, 789166 cures and 4111 deaths.
 As on 23 June, total number of cases was 797138, including 2680 active cases, 790347 cures and 4111 fatalities. There hasn't been and Covid related death in the state is almost 3 months now.

July to September 2022 
 As on 31 August, total number of cases in Telegana was 834478, including 1545 active cases, 828822 cures and 4111 fatalities.
 As on 5 September, total number of cases was 834965, including 1189 active cases, 829665 recoveries and 4111 deaths.
 As on 17 September, total number of cases was 836621, including 768 active cases, 831742 cures and 4111 deaths.
 As on 25 September, total number of cases was 837326, including 705 active cases, 832510 cures and 4111 fatal cases.
 As on 26 October, total number of cases was 839836, including 507 active cases, 835218 recoveries and 4111 fatal cases.

Statistics
High Positivity Rate:

Positivity Rate can be loosely defined as the number of patients turning positive for coronavirus upon testing per every 100 suspects. This rate can be calculated either on a daily basis or on a cumulative basis on the total number of tests conducted. In this parameter, Telangana state fares as one of the worst performing state in India with very high positivity rate.

As per the health bulletin issued by Government of Telangana on June 30, Telangana state claims to have conducted a cumulative number of 88563 tests of which, 16339 tested positive. The overall positivity rate comes to 18.44% (applicable for up to June 30). It needs to be noted that for a long time, the Telangana state did not publicly disclose the daily number of tests it was conducting daily that drew the ire of the High Court. Hence, the cumulative number of tests cannot be corroborated.

The daily positivity rate for number of tests conducted by Telangana state on June 30 comes to 27.33%. On 30 June, the Telangana state conducted 3457 tests, out of which the positive cases were 945.

Testing
As per Telangana government media bulletin dated 31-Jul-2020, 
number of testing facilities in the state are as below.

Status of Tests in the state is as below.

Response
As on 27 July, more than 60% of COVID-19 victims of the state had been buried in a single graveyard named Faqeer Mullah Kabristan on the outskirts of Hyderabad.

COVID-19 Vaccines with Approval for Emergency or Conditional Usage

Covishield

On January 1, 2021, the Drug Controller General of India, approved the emergency or conditional use of AstraZeneca's COVID-19 vaccine AZD1222 (marketed as Covishield). Covishield is developed by the University of Oxford and its spin-out company, Vaccitech. It's a viral vector vaccine based on replication-deficient Adenovirus that causes cold in Chimpanzees. 
It can be stored, transported and handled at normal refrigerated conditions (two-eight degrees Celsius/ 36-46 degrees Fahrenheit). It has a shelf-life of at least six months.

On 12 January 2021 first batches of Covishield vaccine was despatched from the Serum Institute of India.

Covaxin
On January 2, 2021, BBV152 (marketed as Covaxin), first indigenous vaccine, developed by Bharat Biotech in association with the Indian Council of Medical Research and National Institute of Virology received approval from the Drug Controller General of India for its emergency or conditional usage.

On 14 January 2021 first batches of Covaxin vaccine was despatched from the Bharat Biotech, albeit it was still in the third phase of testing.

Others
On 19 May 2021, Dr Reddy's Labs received Emergency Use Authorisation for anti-COVID drug 2-DG. On 21 February, 2022, Drugs Controller General of India granted approval to Biological E's COVID-19 vaccine Corbevax, that can be used for children between 12 and 18 years of age.

On 21 October 2021, India completed administering of one billion Covid vaccines in the country.

On 8 January 2022, India crossed 1.5 billion Covid vaccines milestone in the country.

On 19 February 2022, India crossed 1.75 billion Covid vaccines milestone in the country.

Vaccination
On 12 January 2021, a consignment of 3.64 lakh doses of Oxford-AstraZeneca's Covishield vaccine arrived in Hyderabad from Pune. Along with 3.64 lakh doses of Covishield, manufactured by Serum Institute of India, the Telangana Health department has received 20,000 doses of Bharat Biotech's Covaxin on 13 January 2021. S Kistamma, a female sanitation worker at the Gandhi Hospital in Secunderabad, became the first person in Telangana to receive the COVID-19 vaccination on the morning of 16 January 2020.

See also
COVID-19 pandemic in India
COVID-19 pandemic

Notes

References

COVID-19 pandemic in India by state or union territory